Wollongbar is a town (2016 population: 2,828) in the Northern Rivers region of New South Wales, Australia.  The town is located on the Bruxner Highway between the towns of Lismore and Alstonville.

Schools
Wollongbar Public School is at the centre of the Wollongbar community. It has a school motto of "Learning for Life". It is a member of The Plateau to the Sea Learning Community. School achievements include representation at regional and state levels of sporting competition and performing arts opportunities.

Sport
Wollongbar's main sporting club is the Wollongbar Alstonville Rugby (W.A.R) which was founded in 1992. The club has teams from under 8s right through to under 19s and has 3 grade sides. The club has won numerous junior premierships and 5 straight first grade titles.
WAR plays at Lyle Park, Wollongbar.

References

Towns in New South Wales
Northern Rivers
Ballina Shire